Gu'an Town is the seat of Gu'an County in central Hebei province, located just south of the border with Beijing. , it has 8 residential communities and 103 villages under its administration. Access to central parts of Beijing is provided by G45 Daqing–Guangzhou Expressway and China National Highway 106.

See also
List of township-level divisions of Hebei

References

Township-level divisions of Hebei
Gu'an County